New York's 11th State Assembly district is one of the 150 districts in the New York State Assembly. It has been represented by Democrat Kimberly Jean-Pierre since 2015.

Geography

2020s 
District 11 contains portions of Suffolk and Nassau counties. It includes portions of the town of Babylon, including Lindenhurst, Amityville, Wheatley Heights and parts of Wyandanch. It also includes a portion of East Massapequa.

2010s 
District 11 is in Suffolk County. It includes portions of the town of Babylon, including Lindenhurst, Amityville, Wheatley Heights and parts of Wyandanch.

Recent election results

2022

2020

2018

2016

2014

2012

2010

References 

11
Suffolk County, New York